Henri Tamminen (born April 22, 1993) is a Finnish professional ice hockey player. He is currently playing for BHF of the Swedish HockeyEttan.

Tamminen made his Liiga debut playing with HIFK during the 2013–14 Liiga season.

References

External links

1993 births
Living people
Peliitat Heinola players
Lempäälän Kisa players
HIFK (ice hockey) players
Finnish ice hockey right wingers
People from Espoo